Acompocoris alpinus is a true bug in the family Anthocoridae. The species is found in Europe. It occurs on conifers, where it is  a predator of aphids. In France at an altitude of 1,200 – 2,000 m.
A. alpinus Reuter, is found on Abies and Picea

References 

Hemiptera of Europe
Anthocoridae
Insects described in 1875